The 1971 Mediterranean Games, officially known as the VI Mediterranean Games, and commonly known as Izmir 1971, were the 6th Mediterranean Games. The Games were held in İzmir, Turkey, from 6 to 17 October 1971, where 1,362 athletes (1,235 men and 127 women) from 15 countries participated. There were a total of 137 medal events from 17 different sports.

Participating nations

 (38)
 (109)
 (50)
 (159)
 (162)
 (2)
 (36)
 (11)
 (76)
 (148)
 (108)
 (83)
 (219)
 (161)

Sports

Medal table

References
 Serbian Olympic Committee

See also
International Mediterranean Games Committee
Mediterranean Games Athletic results at gbrathletics website

 
1971
Multi-sport events in Turkey
International sports competitions hosted by Turkey
1971 in multi-sport events
1971 in Turkish sport
Sports competitions in Izmir
October 1971 sports events in Europe
1971,Mediterranean Games